Polish–Muscovite War can refer to:
Muscovite–Lithuanian Wars
Polish–Muscovite War (1605–18)
Smolensk War (1631–34)
Russo-Polish War (1654–67)